The Monrovia Consolidated School System (MCSS) provides primary and secondary education to the population of the Monrovia metropolitan area, Liberia. The MCSS was established by government charter in 1964 under the Act to Amend the Education Law to Create the Monrovia Consolidated School System.

History
Prior to the creation of the MCSS, schools in Monrovia were individually administered by principals reporting directly to the Ministry of Education. A Memorandum of Understanding, the preliminary step to the establishment of the system, was signed on 28 February 1963.

References

Education in Monrovia
1964 establishments in Liberia
Educational institutions established in 1964